Nathaniel Bacon (1598–1676), better known under the assumed name of Southwell, (Sotwel, or Sotvellus in Latin), taken in honor of the Jesuit poet-martyr, Robert Southwell (Jesuit), was an English Jesuit who served in Rome from 1647 until his death as "Secretarius" of the Society of Jesus under four Jesuit generals. He produced an encyclopedic bibliography in folio, Bibliotheca Scriptorum Societatis Jesu (Rome, 1676), much admired for its thoroughness and latinity, although the listings follow the traditional categorization according to authors' Christian names. This was a continuation of the bibliographies of Pedro de Ribadeneira and Philippe Alegambe.

In the 19th century it was updated by Belgian Jesuits Augustin de Backer and Carlos Sommervogel as Bibliothèque de la Compagnie de Jesus, with authors listed by surname, a standard reference work.

External links
 
 The 1676 Bibliotheca scriptorum Societatis Iesu is online as a Google book

1598 births
1676 deaths
17th-century English Jesuits
17th-century English writers
17th-century English male writers